Triple Exposure is an album by saxophonist Hal McKusick which was recorded in 1957 and released on the Prestige label.

Reception

Scott Yanow of Allmusic stated, "Two talented but forgotten bop-based improvisers are featured on this quintet set: Hal McKusick (who switches between his Paul Desmond-inspired alto, tenor and cool-toned clarinet) and trombonist Billy Byers".

Track listing 
All compositions by Hal McKusick except as indicated
 "Interim" - 5:51 Bonus track on CD reissue     
 "Saturday Night (Is the Loneliest Night of the Week)" (Jule Styne, Sammy Cahn) - 7:13     
 "Don't Worry 'bout Me" (Rube Bloom, Ted Koehler) - 8:09 Bonus track on CD reissue     
 "Con Alma" (Dizzy Gillespie) - 7:43 Bonus track on CD reissue     
 "Something New" (Albert Gamse, Ricardo López Méndez) - 5:11     
 "Blues Half-Smiling" - 5:33     
 "A Touch of Spring" - 6:00     
 "The Settlers and the Indians" (Robert Scott) - 9:10     
 "I'm Glad There Is You" (Jimmy Dorsey, Paul Madeira) - 3:50

Personnel 
Hal McKusick - alto saxophone, tenor saxophone, clarinet
Billy Byers - trombone
Eddie Costa - piano
Paul Chambers - bass
Charlie Persip - drums

References 

Hal McKusick albums
1958 albums
Prestige Records albums
Albums produced by Bob Weinstock
Albums recorded at Van Gelder Studio